David's fulvetta (Alcippe davidi) is a species of bird in the family Alcippeidae. It is endemic to southern China and northern Vietnam.

Its natural habitat is subtropical or tropical moist montane forest.

References

David's fulvetta
Birds of South China
David's fulvetta